Hefei Xinqiao International Airport  is the main airport serving Hefei, the capital of Anhui Province, China.  It is located near the town of Gaoliu in Shushan District,  from the city center.  Construction started in December 2008 with a total investment of 3.728 billion yuan.  Opened on 30 May 2013, it replaced Luogang Airport as Hefei's main airport.

In December 2022, Hefei gained direct flights to Europe when Condor started flights to Frankfurt in Germany.

Facilities
The first phase of construction includes one runway which is 3,400 meters long and 45 meters wide (class 4E), and a 108,500 square-meter terminal building, to handle a projected annual volume of 11 million passengers and 150,000 tons of cargo by 2020. A second phase is being planned to handle 42 million passengers and 580,000 tons of cargo by 2040.

Airlines and destinations

Passenger

See also
List of airports in China
List of the busiest airports in China

References

Airports in Anhui
Transport in Hefei
Airports established in 2013
2013 establishments in China